Trevor Denman (born 24 September 1952) is a South African American sportscaster and public-address announcer specializing in Thoroughbred horse racing.

Background
Denman was born in Germiston, Gauteng, South Africa. A part-time jockey and exercise rider, he started as a race caller in his native South Africa in 1971 at age 18. He called two races at Santa Anita Park in 1983 and was hired that year as the announcer of the track's Oak Tree meet. He was named Santa Anita's permanent announcer the following year.
He has also called races at Del Mar Racetrack, Pimlico Race Course, Laurel Park Racecourse, Atlantic City Race Course, and Hollywood Park Racetrack.

In December 2015, Denman announced that he would be retiring as Santa Anita's race caller after 33 years. He plans to continue calling races at Del Mar, while spending the rest of the time either on his Minnesota farm or traveling.

Style
He is best known for the phrase "And away they go...", spoken as the horses emerge from the starting gate.
Some other phrases that Denman has coined are popular with racing fans, such as "scraping the paint", used to describe a horse who is saving ground (running very close to the inner rail). Another is "they would need to sprout wings to catch __ ..." when a horse is leading by an insurmountable margin in the stretch.  A similar phrase used in the same context is "he's [or she's] out here moving like a winner..."  "__ looks like he jumped in at the quarter pole..." is used when a horse comes from far back and is running so fast as to give the impression that he has only just started to run. Finally, another well known Denman phrase is, "_ is coming like an express train!" This phrase is used when a horse is running right by leading horses in the stretch. He owns a three-year-old filly in South Africa, named Top Twenty, trained by Paul Lafferty.

Breeders' Cup
Denman was the voice of the Breeders' Cup when it aired on ESPN. He replaced Tom Durkin, who had been the race caller since the inception.

During the 2009 Breeders' Cup Classic, Denman made perhaps his most famous call when undefeated Zenyatta came from behind to win the race. Denman called, "Zenyatta has a lot, a lot of ground to make up.... If she wins this she will be a super horse." Denman delivered this call as Zenyatta took the lead. "Zenyatta's come to the outside. Zenyatta coming, flying on the grandstand side... THIS, IS, UN-BELIEVABLE!"

Other media
In the 1989 comedy movie Let It Ride starring Richard Dreyfuss and  Teri Garr, Denman is the track announcer that is heard in many of the racetrack scenes that took place at Hialeah Park in Hialeah, Florida. Trevor Denman was also the announcer in the movie Racing Stripes during the race.

Denman was the unnamed race announcer in the animated television show The Simpsons episode #239, aired originally in February 2000, entitled Saddlesore Galactica. He had a recurring role in the HBO series Luck, in his real-life job at Santa Anita.

Denman also makes an appearance in a Verizon commercial.

References

1952 births
American horse racing announcers
Living people
People from Germiston
South African sportsmen